Raja Peary Mohan College is a general purpose college in Hooghly District of West Bengal, India under the University of Calcutta. It offers undergraduate level courses in various arts , commerce and science subjects. The college is a popular institution for undergraduate study in the neighborhood of Uttarpara, the Hooghly district, Howrah and the North 24 Parganas.

History
The college was established in 1881 by late Raja Joy Krishna Mukherjee (who was the father of Raja Peary Mohan Mukherjee), a leading social reformer and educationist of colonial Bengal, when it was under the British rule.

See also 
List of colleges affiliated to the University of Calcutta
Education in India
Education in West Bengal

References

External links

Raja Peary Mohan College official website
Raja Peary Mohan College Online Admission

Academic institutions associated with the Bengal Renaissance
Educational institutions established in 1887
University of Calcutta affiliates
Universities and colleges in Hooghly district
1887 establishments in India